Seafaring Is Necessary (German: Seefahrt ist Not) is a 1921 German silent drama film directed by Rudolf Biebrach and starring Hans Marr, Lucie Höflich and Ilka Grüning. It is based on a novel by Gorch Fock.

The film's sets were designed by the art director Hans Sohnle.

Cast
 Hans Marr
 Lucie Höflich
 Ilka Grüning
 Rudolf Biebrach
 Hugo Döblin
 Albert Kuntze
 Werner Pfullmann
 Hermann Picha
 Tommy Tomborini

References

Bibliography
 Hans-Michael Bock & Michael Töteberg. Das Ufa-Buch. Zweitausendeins, 1992.

External links

1921 films
Films of the Weimar Republic
Films directed by Rudolf Biebrach
German silent feature films
1921 drama films
German drama films
UFA GmbH films
German black-and-white films
Films about fishing
Films set in the Atlantic Ocean
Films set in Hamburg
Films based on German novels
Silent drama films
Silent adventure films
1920s German films
1920s German-language films